Nazrul Jayanti is the birthday of Kazi Nazrul Islam the national poet of Bangladesh on 24 May. The day is organized and celebrated by various schools, colleges & universities of Bengal, and also celebrated by Bengalis around the world, as a tribute to Nazrul and his works. 122th birthday 2022

See also
 List of festivals in Bangladesh
 List of festivals in West Bengal

References

Festivals in Bangladesh
Kazi Nazrul Islam